Chelsea Pitman (born 8 June 1988) is an Australian-born netball player representing the England National Netball Team internationally. She is currently contracted as a training partner for the West Coast Fever playing in the Suncorp Super Netball competition in Australia. West Coast Fever has just became premiers after winning the Suncorp Super Netball League 2022 (first time in 25 years). She is predominantly a wing attack, but can also play goal attack.

Domestic career
Pitman's career began in New South Wales, representing the state at underage national championships before moving to the Australian Institute of Sport in Canberra where she was noticed by national head coach Norma Plummer.

In 2010, she was signed by New Zealand ANZ Championship franchise the Canterbury Tactix. However, in round 6 against the Northern Mystics, she suffered an ACL injury that ended her season.

After a successful ACL rehabilitation, she joined the Queensland Firebirds in 2011. Significant improvement throughout the season resulted in Pitman becoming the starting wing attack and helping the Firebirds win the ANZ Championship in an undefeated season. Her breakthrough season was capped off with selection in the Australian Netball Diamonds team for the 2011 World Netball Championships in Singapore, where Australia retained the title.

In 2013, Pitman was part of the Firebirds team who made it to the ANZ Championship Grand Final for the second time in 3 years where they were defeated by the Adelaide Thunderbirds 50-48. At the conclusion of the season, she and Firebirds teammate Natalie Medhurst, announced that they had signed with the West Coast Fever for the 2014 season.

Towards the end of the 2014, Pitman announced that she would take the following season (2015) off from the ANZ Championship to consider her netball future. In July 2014, she signed a one-year contract with Netball Superleague side Manchester Thunder for the 2015 season in England. For the 2016 season, she returned to play in the ANZ Championship, signing for New Zealand side Central Pulse. After the dissolution of the ANZ Championship in July 2016, Pitman signed with the Adelaide Thunderbirds for the 2017 Suncorp Super Netball season. Pitman starred for the Thunderbirds during their 2017 campaign and was ultimately named the 2017 Club Champion after a highly successful season.

Pitman was a co-captain of the Thunderbirds in 2019 and 2020, sharing the role initially with English international teammate Layla Guscoth and later sharing it with Australian team-mate Hannah Petty. After the 2020 Suncorp Super Netball Season, Pitman was not offered a new contract by the Adelaide Thunderbirds. This resulted in her playing the 2021 season in Netball South Australia's Premier League competition for the Garville Netball Club. After concluding her season playing for Garville Netball Club, Pitman returns to the West Coast Fever again, accepting a training partner position for the 2022 Suncorp Super Netball Season.

International career
Pitman made her international debut against the Silver Ferns during a series of international matches prior to the 2011 World Netball Championships in Singapore. During the world championships, she featured regularly at wing attack in her first major international tournament. In the gold medal match against New Zealand, she was brought onto wing attack at half time when the Diamonds were six goals down and helped the Diamonds draw level at the end of regulation time to send the game into extra time. The Diamonds went onto win the match 58-57 and claim the world championship with Pitman playing a major role in the Diamond's comeback.

She represented the Australian Netball Diamonds throughout 2012 during the Quad Series against South Africa, New Zealand and England. However, she was unable to make a return to the national squad after this series.

In 2017 Pitman was selected into the England National Netball Team through her Yorkshire-born father. She later made her international debut for England against South Africa in the 2017 January Quad Series, and helped them claim two historic wins over the New Zealand Silver Ferns in 2017. She was part of the England team which won the Gold Medal at the 2018 Commonwealth Games, defeating Australia in the final which was an historic moment for netball in England. In 2019, Pitman was selected in the England National Netball Team for the 2019 Netball World Cup where the team won the Bronze Medal.

References

1988 births
Living people
English netball players
Australian netball players
Australia international netball players
Australian Institute of Sport netball players
Mainland Tactix players
Queensland Firebirds players
West Coast Fever players
Manchester Thunder players
ANZ Championship players
Australian Netball League players
Suncorp Super Netball players
Netball Superleague players
Netball players at the 2018 Commonwealth Games
Commonwealth Games gold medallists for England
Commonwealth Games medallists in netball
2019 Netball World Cup players
Netball players from Sydney
Sydney Swifts players
Adelaide Thunderbirds players
Australian expatriate netball people in New Zealand
English expatriate netball people in New Zealand
2011 World Netball Championships players
Central Pulse players
Australian expatriate netball people in England
Medallists at the 2018 Commonwealth Games